is a former Japanese football player for Fukushima United FC.

Club statistics
Updated to 2 February 2018.

References

External links

Profile at Fukushima United FC

1992 births
Living people
Tokai Gakuen University alumni
Association football people from Gifu Prefecture
Japanese footballers
J3 League players
Fukushima United FC players
Association football defenders